The Man from Monterey is a 1933 American pre-Code Western directed by Mack V. Wright and starring John Wayne. The picture was released by Warner Bros. Pictures. This film was the last of six films John Wayne made at Warner Bros. between 1932 and 1933.

The opening credit to The Man from Monterey lists the stars as "John Wayne and Duke." That's not a misprint. John Wayne became known as The Duke later in his career, of course, but he appeared with an equine co-star by the name of Duke (aka Duke the Devil Horse); this was common practice in the days of B-western heroes and in the six films Wayne made for Warner Bros.

Plot
The story is based on the requirement of Spanish land owners in California to register their lands before a deadline and the chicanery practiced by some to prevent registration. U.S. Army Captain John Holmes is dispatched to encourage one of the largest Spanish landowners, Don Jose Castanares, to register before the deadline hoping the other landowners will fall in line. Meanwhile, Don Luis Gonzales and his father, Don Pablo Gonzales plot to acquire the Castanares land by forcing Don Jose's daughter, Delores, to marry Don Luis, and holding Don Jose captive. Holmes and his buddy, Felipe, trick the Gonzaleses and thwart their plans. Holmes, who is attracted to Delores, wins her love.

Cast
 John Wayne as Capt. John Holmes
 Ruth Hall as Dolores Castanares
 Luis Alberni as Felipe Guadalupe Constacio Delgado Santa Cruz de la Verranca
 Donald Reed as Don Luis Gonzales
 Nina Quartero as Anita Garcia
 Francis Ford as Don Pablo Gonzales
 Lafe McKee as Don Jose Castanares
 Lillian Leighton as Juanita
 Slim Whitaker as Jake Morgan
 John T. Prince as Padre

Box office
According to Warner Bros the film earned $137,000 domestically and $56,000 foreign. a

See also
 John Wayne filmography

References

External links
 
 
 
 

1933 films
1933 Western (genre) films
American Western (genre) films
American black-and-white films
Films directed by Mack V. Wright
Warner Bros. films
1930s English-language films
1930s American films